Kadathanadu (Vatakara) was a former feudatory (of Kolathunad) city-state in present-day Kerala, on the Malabar Coast. The region is most known for being the area where the events of the Vadakkan Pattukal, a set of warrior ballads from Kerala, took place, and for being one of the heartlands of Kerala's native martial art, Kalarippayattu.

Geographical location
Geographically, Kadathanadu is situated to the south of Thalassery and north of Koyilandy on the Malabar coast, beside the historical Kotakkal river. The area roughly six kilometers from Vatakara is known as Kadathanadu. The place is now part of Puduppanam in Vatakara.

Kadathanadu, apart from its cultural richness, is also the site of a famous Hindu temple, the Lokanarkavu temple.

History
The erstwhile princely state of Kadathanadu was ruled by Rajas of Kadathanadu also known as Kadathanadttu Raja, who were of Nair origin and was feudatories to the Kolathiri. Around 1750, the ruler of Kadathanadu had adopted the title of Raja, with the explicit consent of the Kolathiri.  Harivihar is the 150-year-old residence of the Kadathanadu royal family. Legend has it that the sons of the Kadathanadu rulers were sent to Calicut to be educated in institutions set up by the Zamorin of Calicut, and hence a city house was built for the young princes.

During Malayalam Era 965 corresponding to 1789-90, Tipu Sultan crossed over to Malabar with his army.  A small army of 2000 Nairs and Thiyyar of Kadathanadu resisted the invasion from a fortress in Kuttipuram near Nadapuram for a few weeks.

References

Feudal states of Kerala
History of Kozhikode district